"Dust on the Bottle" is a song written and recorded by American country music artist David Lee Murphy.  It was released in August 1995 as the fourth single from the album Out with a Bang. The song hit number one on the Billboard Hot Country Singles & Tracks in late 1995, and is Murphy's first number one hit. It would remain his only number one single until almost 23 years later, when he topped the country charts again with "Everything's Gonna Be Alright" in June 2018. The song also hit number 9 on the Canadian Country charts.

Background and writing
In an interview with The Boot, Murphy said that he was playing guitar at his kitchen table in the morning and the song "came out of nowhere." Murphy goes on to say that he wrote the song in 15 minutes.

Content
The song is about an old man named  “Creole” Williams. The narrator asks him for advice on impressing his lover, and Williams gives him a bottle of homemade wine, then tells him "There might be a little dust on the bottle / But don’t let it fool ya about what’s inside/There might be a little dust on the bottle/But it’s one of those things, it gets sweeter with time”.

Music video
The music video was directed by Charley Randazzo and premiered in mid-1995.

Chart positions
"Dust on the Bottle" debuted at number 72 on the U.S. Billboard Hot Country Singles & Tracks for the week of August 12, 1995.

Year-end charts

Certifications

References

1995 singles
1995 songs
David Lee Murphy songs
Songs written by David Lee Murphy
Song recordings produced by Tony Brown (record producer)
MCA Records singles
Country rock songs
Songs about alcohol